Gino's Italian Escape is a British documentary that has aired on ITV since 13 September 2013 and is presented by Gino D'Acampo. The series follows Gino as he explores some of Italy's best loved locations through some of the country's dishes notable to each region. After tasting local dishes with ingredients notable to that region, Gino prepares some dishes of his own.

Transmissions

2015 Tour
In 2015, Gino toured the UK in Gino's Italian Escape: The Live Tour.

Bath (29 October)
York (30 October)
Southend (1 November)
Cambridge (2 November)
Wolverhampton (3 November)
Aberdeen (5 November)
Newcastle (6 November)
Ipswich (7 November)
Margate (8 November)

2017 Tour
In 2017, Gino toured the UK in Gino's Italian Escape: The Live Tour.

Newcastle (21 April)
Grimsby (22 April)
Cambridge (23 April)
Leicester (24 April)
Liverpool (25 April)
Ipswich (27 April)
Watford (28 April)
Basingstoke (29 April)
Cardiff (1 May)
Sheffield (2 May)
York (4 May)
Dundee (5 May)
Edinburgh (6 May)
Nottingham (7 May)
Aylesbury (8 May)
Bath (9 May)
Portsmouth (10 May)
Guildford (11 May)

2018 Tour
In 2018, Gino toured the UK in Gino's Italian Escape: The Live Tour.

Manchester (9 June)
Leeds (10 June)
Sheffield (11 June)
Bath (12 June)

Books
Gino's Italian Escape (released 14 September 2013)
Gino's Italian Escape: A Taste of the Sun (released 11 September 2014)
Gino's Italian Escape: Islands in the Sun (released 29 October 2015)
Gino's Hidden Italy (released 6 October 2016)
Gino's Italian Coastal Escape (released 19 October 2017)
Gino's Italian Adriatic Escape (released 18 October 2018)
Gino's Italian Express (released 15 November 2019)

References

External links

2013 British television series debuts
2010s British cooking television series
2010s British documentary television series
2010s British travel television series
2020s British cooking television series
2020s British documentary television series
2020s British travel television series
English-language television shows
ITV (TV network) original programming
Television series by ITV Studios